For decades, hundreds of organizations and individuals advocated that the American football team formerly known as the Washington Redskins should change its name and logo. In July 2020, following a wave of racial awareness and reforms in wake of national protests after the murder of George Floyd, major sponsors of the league and team threatened to stop supporting them until the name was changed. As a result, the team initiated a review of the name and decided to retire it and the logo, temporarily playing as the Washington Football Team pending adoption of a permanent name. The new name, Washington Commanders, was announced on February 2, 2022.

The team was one of the leading examples of the Native American mascot controversy, as the Redskins name itself is defined as derogatory or insulting in American English dictionaries. The issue is often discussed in the media in terms of offensiveness or political correctness, which reduces it to feelings and opinions, and prevents full understanding of the historical, psychological and sociological context provided by academic research on the negative effects of the use of Native American names and images by sports teams. As of 2010, over 115 professional organizations representing civil rights and scientific experts published resolutions or policies stating that the use of Native American names and symbols by non-native sports teams is a harmful form of ethnic stereotyping that promotes racial prejudice.

Since its founding in 1944, the National Congress of American Indians (NCAI) has campaigned to eliminate negative stereotyping of Native American peoples in the media. Over time, the campaign began to focus on Indian names and mascots in sports. The NCAI maintains that teams with mascots such as the Braves and the Redskins perpetuate negative stereotypes of Native American people, and demean their native traditions and rituals. The NCAI issued a report in 2013 summarizing opposition to Indian mascots and team names generally, and the Washington Redskins in particular. In the trademark case, the Trademark Trial and Appeal Board placed significance on the NCAI opposition, estimating that the organization represented about 30% of the Native American population at the time the trademarks were granted, which met their criteria for a "substantial composite" of Native Americans finding the name disparaging.

Although the Washington name change has eliminated the focus on one team, efforts to remove Native American mascots in general has been sustained, with special attention on high school teams that continue to be Redskins.

Native Americans 
The following groups passed resolutions or issued statements regarding their opposition to the name of the Washington NFL team:

Tribes

Yocha Dehe Wintun Nation (Northern California)

Organizations

After accepting $200,000 from the Washington Redskins Original Americans Foundation for the prior year, the Indian National Finals Rodeo (INFR), which says it is the U.S.' and Canada's largest rodeo organization for Native Americans, sent a letter refusing any further donations. INFR Vice President Michael Bo Vocu stated "After much soul searching, we have decided that we cannot in good conscience accept resources from you on the terms you have offered, no matter how desperately we need it ... because, as you know, the resources you are offering are not truly philanthropic -- they come with the expectation that we will support the racial slur that continues to promote your associated professional football team's name." Last year the Redskins primary logo appeared at many Native rodeo events, creating a backlash from those offended by it.

Individuals
Interviews at a powwow in Towson, Maryland, find several Native Americans who favor a change of the Redskins name.

These Native Americans put their opposition to the Redskins' name on the public record:

Civil rights and religious organizations
Anti-Defamation League
Central Conference of American Rabbis
Fritz Pollard Alliance 
Leadership Conference on Civil and Human Rights, a coalition of over 200 individual organizations 
NAACP
 Seattle Human Rights Commission
Religious Action Center of Reform Judaism
United Church of Christ General Synod

Politicians and government agencies
In 2015 a Native American parent, with the support of the local Native American Bar Association, has asked the school board of Montgomery County, Maryland to amend the dress code to ban students or staff from wearing clothing bearing the name or logo of any Native American mascot in any county school. The problem is presented as stereotypes promoted by mascots, but special mention was made of the name Redskins being a slur. A school board spokesman stated that previous complaints have been made, but handled individually.

Political opinion
Statements by political figures have generally been expressions of personal opinion rather than recommendations for government action. There have also been non-binding resolutions proposed in New Jersey and passed in Minneapolis, New York State and California.

Although the majority of those who advocated a name change are Democrats, there is no indication that the issue is of any real significance in electoral decisions given that Native Americans are such a small percentage of the electorate and are not likely to influence the outcome of any election. There are only eight states where Natives make up greater than 2 percent of the population: Alaska, Arizona, Montana, New Mexico, North Dakota, Oklahoma, South Dakota and Wyoming. However, polls show a definite political difference in the opinion of the general public, with only 58% of Democrats opposing a name change versus 89% of Republicans.

The topic came up in a 2013 interview of President Barack Obama, who stated that if he were the owner of the Redskins, he would consider changing the name because it offends many Native Americans, but that he didn't "have a stake" in the issue as he is not an owner of a professional sports team. In direct response Lanny Davis repeated the team position that no offense is intended to Native Americans, and refers to both the 2004 poll and a recent AP poll that show a large majority of people nationally support the continued use of the name. However, in November, 2015 Obama, speaking at the White House Tribal Nations Conference, stated "Names and mascots of sports teams like the Washington Redskins perpetuate negative stereotypes of Native Americans" and praised Adidas for a new initiative to help schools change names and mascots by designing new logos and paying for part of the cost of new uniforms.

Senators Nancy Pelosi and Harry Reid stated in 2013 that the name should be changed. In an interview on May 2, 2014, Senator John McCain stated that he would probably change the name because there are Native Americans who are offended. Former Attorney General Eric Holder gave his personal opinion, as a fan of the team, the name should change, saying that it is offensive. In a television interview Hillary Clinton said that the name should change because it is insensitive.

On May 22, 2014, fifty U.S. Senators, forty-eight Democrats and two Independents, sent a letter to NFL Commissioner Goodell asking the league, referencing the Donald Sterling case, "send the same clear message as the NBA did: that racism and bigotry have no place in professional sports." Five Democratic Senators declined to sign the letter, and Republicans were not invited to do so. In his weekly conference call with Iowa reporters June 26, 2014, Senator Tom Harkin said "It has become clear to me over time that the name of the "Washington Redskins" is an affront to Native Americans and it is time to change it." No Senators have publicly supported the name, but rather have either declined to give an opinion or stated their opposition to Senate involvement in the issue. In 2016, U.S. Representative John Katko, became one of only three Republicans to advocate a change in a letter sent to Goodell, who responded that a name change is for the team to decide.

In February 2016, British Labour MPs Ruth Smeeth and Ian Austin sent a letter to Goodell requesting that the team's name be changed or, "at the minimum", send another team to replace the Redskins in the scheduled NFL International Series game against the Cincinnati Bengals. Britain has stricter laws against racism in sports, criminalising racist chanting at soccer games, and the game's host, Wembley Stadium, has its own anti-racism charter. The game went ahead, and was played to a 27–27 tie.

In March 2016 Presidential candidate Bernie Sanders stated his opposition to the name.

When the Redskins participated in "Blackout Tuesday" on June 2, 2020, Alexandria Ocasio-Cortez responded on Twitter: "Want to really stand for racial justice? Change your name." Subsequently, Mayor Muriel Bowser interrelated her position that the name is an impediment to the team's return to a stadium in the District of Columbia.

DC Metro area jurisdictions
The Council of the District of Columbia passed a resolution on November 5, 2013, stating its position that the name should be changed. On May 19, 2015, the five-member County Board of Arlington County, Virginia, adopted a resolution calling on the owners of the Redskins to change a team name that the board said is "objectionable to many Americans, Virginians and Arlingtonians." While a board member supporting the resolution stated that he was descended from the Mayans, two members abstained from voting, stating that they did not agree that the board should take a position on the issue.

Much of the local political discussion has been about building a stadium, beginning in the 1990s when a Maryland location was chosen for what is now FedExField. With the possibility of building a new stadium in the near future, both the previous and current mayors of the District of Columbia have stated that a name change must be part of the discussion, however the team rejects that possibility. When Governor of Virginia in 2014 Terry McAuliffe met with the owner to discuss the building of a new stadium in Virginia. For many years, beginning with the departure of the Baltimore Colts, the Redskins were the only NFL team in a large area from Maryland into the southern states. This is slowly changing as Maryland NFL fans move to the Baltimore Ravens. Many Maryland politicians have stated that the name should change, but the current governor opposes any change, also citing the desire to keep the stadium in Maryland. Virginia fans are now the more numerous and dedicated supporters of the Redskins, and the state and local governments have used economic incentives to encourage the team's relocation of its facilities there, and maintain that the name is entirely a business decision for the team to make.

Department of Interior
Interior Secretary Sally Jewell, while expressing her personal opinion that she is surprised that the name has not changed given the racial overtones of referring to skin color, also states that tribal leaders do not bring up the issue in discussions with her. However, Jewell, in response to DC Mayor Muriel Bowser's expressed interest in having the team return to the city, stated that the National Park Service, which owns the land, would not likely allow a new stadium to be constructed without a name change.

Federal Communications Commission
Led by Reed E. Hundt, chairman of the FCC from 1993 to 1997, other former Federal Communications Commission (FCC) officials and experts in communications law sent a letter in 2013 to the current chairman of the FCC asking that the use of "redskin" by broadcast media be regulated in the same manner as other racially charged words. Other racial slurs are generally prohibited entirely based upon FCC rules regarding profanity and obscenity; or the name could have only limited use based upon whether its use is in the public interest. In particular, Hundt argued that Snyder should be declared unfit to own radio stations (he owns Red Zebra Broadcasting, owners of Redskins flagship station WTEM) because the FCC "has been reluctant to give broadcast licenses to people who advocate racially intolerant positions". Jessica Rosenworcel is the only current FCC commissioner so far to publicly state that she has concerns about the name, and recognizes that it is offensive to a number of people. The current head of the FCC, Tom Wheeler, agrees that the name is derogatory and should be changed, but does not plan to use the power of the agency to force the change. George Washington University law professor John Banzhaf challenged the licensing of the radio stations operated by Red Zebra Broadcasting, and those of the TV affiliates of the broadcast networks that air NFL games, on the basis of the term "Redskins" being a racial slur that should not be routinely used, particularly during prime time when children are listening.  A report  on the high incidence of violence against Native American children by non-natives is being cited as evidence that the use of the word Redskins is not only a racial slur but is "hate speech" which should be regulated by the FCC. The report comes from the Attorney General's Advisory Committee on American Indian and Alaska Native Children Exposed to Violence. Native American petitioners in the cases filed by Banzhaf state that they have experienced or witnessed harm to Native Americans which they believe was caused by "the frequent repetitive use of the word 'R*dskins' on the air." On December 18, 2014, the FCC rejected Banzhaf's petition regarding WWXX-FM on the basis that "Redskins" is not profanity, which is defined as being sexual or excretory in nature.

Editorial policies regarding use of the name

Print publications
The Associated Press (AP) stylebook review committee is considering whether Redskins is an offensive term that should be removed from its stories. Major news organizations continue to use the Redskins name; however, the following publications limit their use of the team nickname, although most said they would not strike "Redskins" from quotations:

The Portland Oregonian (April 1992): Following Native American protests at the World Series and Super Bowl, the editor made the decision to stop using all Native American names.
Kansas City Star (September 24, 2012): The Stars public editor defended his publications' "longtime policy" of avoiding the term "Washington Redskins" by finding "no compelling reason ... to reprint an egregiously offensive term as a casual matter of course."
Washington City Paper (October 18, 2012): The alt weekly WCP unveiled the results of its readers poll, referring to the capital's NFL team thereafter only as "Washington Pigskins" (or "'Skins") "instead of the name the team prefers, which is a pejorative term for Native Americans."
The New Republic editor, Franklin Foer, tweeted that his publication would follow Slate "air-tight" logic and drop "Redskins" from its stylebook.
Mother Jones magazine said it would be "tweaking our house style guide" by following Slate, The New Republic, and the Washington City Paper, referring thereafter to "Washington's pro football team."
The Richmond Free Press announced October 17, 2013 that it will no longer use the Washington NFL team name in news or editorial columns because it is "insulting to Native Americans, racist, and divisive".
San Francisco Chronicle (October 30, 2013): The Chronicles managing editor Audrey Cooper told KCBS that the paper would refer to the team as "Washington," adding, "Why should we err on the side of using an offensive term when we don't have to?
The Syracuse New Times (October 30, 2013)
Orange County Register (November 7, 2013): Speaking on 'Redskins,' OCR sports editor Todd Harmonson said, "It is the Register's policy to avoid using such slurs, so we will not use this one, except in stories about the controversy surrounding its use."
The Seattle Times (June 18, 2014) 
The Detroit News (June 25, 2014) 
The Washington Business Journal (August 1, 2014) 
The New York Daily News (September 3, 2014) will stop using both the name and the logo in its reporting.
The Charlotte Observer (September 7, 2014) will stop using the name unless reporting on the controversy. After a game with the Carolina Panthers, one commentator observed that the Observer avoids the name, using only "Washington" to refer to the team even when discussing the controversy.

These publications, while continuing to print the name, have published editorials advocating a change:
The Utica Observer-Dispatch (September 17, 2013) 
Las Cruces Sun-News (New Mexico) (October 12, 2013)
The Denver Post (October 26, 2013) 
Brainerd Dispatch (Minnesota) (October 28, 2013)
The Chicago Tribune (November 30, 2013) : The owner should acknowledge the trend toward the elimination of Indian mascots and let the fans choose a new name.
The Frederick News-Post (Maryland) (December 28, 2013) 
The Los Angeles Times (May 25, 2014), and again in May, 2016; responding to The Washington Post poll (see below).

The Washington Post
The Washington Post (WaPo) is the oldest and largest newspaper in the team's hometown. The Post first published an editorial in opposition to the name in 1992, saying it "is really pretty offensive." An editorial on July 28, 2014, took note of the increasing number of individual and organizations advocating a change: "Every new objection to the use of the word makes it harder for Mr. Snyder to kid himself that he's helping his team or its fans by holding onto a name that, at bottom, is a racial slur with no place in civilized society."

On August 22, 2014, WaPo took the additional step of stating that the name will no longer be used in editorials, although it will continue to appear in other sections of the newspaper: "Unlike our colleagues who cover sports and other news, we on the editorial board have the luxury of writing about the world as we would like it to be." In addition, there are several  writers/columnists for The Post (see section below) that have taken a personal stand in opposition to the continued use of the name.

In May 2016, the WaPo released a poll of self-identified Native Americans that produced the same results as the 2004 Annenberg poll, that 90% of the 504 respondents were "not bothered" by the team's name. However, the editorial board continues to maintained its prior position that the name is a slur and that they will avoid its use as much as possible. After the United States Supreme Court decision in 2017, finding that the law barring offensive trademarks was an unconstitutional infringement of free speech, the WaPo Editorial Board published its opinion that this was not a victory for the team, since the name Redskins remains offensive and does harm to Native American children. In 2019 the editorial board reiterated their advocacy of name change, citing the opposition to such mascots by Native American tribes that has resulted in their retirement by high schools in Idaho and Maine.

Online publications
The Capital News Service (October 31, 2013): This news wire service at the Merrill College of Journalism at the University of Maryland said it would thereafter call the team "Washington's NFL franchise."
DCist (February 11, 2013): The Washington-area news website DCist published an editorial announcing it would refer to the local NFL club as the Washington football team instead of its trademarked name, which DCist agreed is "distasteful, vulgar, and racist."
The District Sports Page, on the inevitability of the name change: "As long as this issue remains in the public conscience, the Redskins will be compelled to address it. As I said, however, they have yet to find an adequate defense for keeping the name. How much longer can they keep up the charade?"
The Sideline Observer, a media organization serving university communities founded in Bethesda, Maryland, a suburb of Washington, DC. 
Slate in a story (August 8, 2013) stated, "This is the last Slate article that will refer to the Washington NFL team as the Redskins."
Sports Grid (September 17, 2013)

Broadcast media
Robert Lipsyte states that there has been discussion about the use of the name at ESPN, but it is unlikely that it or any other major sports network will stop using Redskins in reporting due to a general consensus that it should report the news (including the controversy) but not take sides, and that taking sides would injure their ability to cover the games. There are also the corporate affiliations that make it unlikely. Steven Gaydos, Vice President & Executive Editor of Variety states his opinion that the broadcast networks should tackle the Redskins name issue. Both the NFL and CBS Sports state that it is entirely up to individual announcers whether they use the name when covering a game.

While not banning Redskins for its broadcasts, National Public Radio (NPR) has advised against the use of the name, stating: "As a responsible broadcaster, NPR has always set a high bar on use of language that may be offensive to our audience. Use of such language on the air has been strictly limited to situations where it is absolutely integral to the meaning and spirit of the story being told." The NPR ombudsman Edward Schumacher-Matos states that the new guideline will likely result in the name rarely being used again on NPR. At the beginning of the 2014 season, several networks report that the number of times "Redskins" was spoken during televised NFL game broadcasts has fallen 42% in 10 weeks compared to the same 10-week period in the previous year, while the use of "Washington" is up 10%. An analysis of the entire 2014 regular season shows a 27% decline in the use of the name in NFL broadcasts compared to the prior year.

Individual opinions
Dr. John Carlos, addressing the owner's response to protests: "To this day, there has been no real negotiation or real listening and understanding that I know of."
D. L. Hughley suggests that players should refuse to play until the name is changed.
Paul Kendrick, author of two books on the history of race relations and lifelong Redskins fan, writes about his realization that the name should change: "Often social progress happens in America when people get beyond an abstract idea and talk with the neighbors and friends who are actually affected. That rarely happens on this issue since too few of us interact with people we recognize as Native Americans on a daily basis."
Spike Lee - The filmmaker says it is the NFL that should pressure the owner to rebrand the team.
Ralph Nader: While advocating a name change, states that this should not be a substitute for addressing the deeper problems faced by Native Americans.
 George Cassidy Payne, adjunct professor of philosophy, SUNY. "In America today, one of the most glaring examples of institutional racism and for profit bigotry, remains the mascotization of Native American cultures. "
Ravi K. Perry - Chair of the Department of Political Science at Howard University and is immediate past president of the Association for Ethnic Studies
Stephen Pevar, Senior Staff Attorney, ACLU: "Our society continues to evolve. Many words that were in common usage decades ago have been relegated to the garbage heap because they are recognized today as demeaning and derogatory. [...] The team has a proud history and dedicated fans. Hopefully the team will soon adopt a name that isn't racially derogatory."
Thomas G. Smith, professor of history at Nichols College, sees a parallel between the current debate and the resistance to racial integration 50 years ago, when the Redskins became the last NFL team to have a black player.
Jordan Wright, granddaughter of the original owner of the team, George Preston Marshall: "They need to change the name. In this day and age, it's just not right."

Advocates in sports for changing the name

Sports writers/commentators
The following individuals in the media have taken a position that the name should be changed, some also deciding that they will stop using it in their own reporting. However, one Native American journalist has observed that in the era of social media, not using the name is counter-productive since the team and its supporters will not know about opposing views in online articles or tweets that do not include the name of the team in a form that can be identified by search engines.

Other journalists/columnists

References

External links
Rebrand Washington Football
Change the Mascot

2010s in North American sport
2010s in Washington, D.C.
20th-century controversies
2010s controversies in the United States
Cultural appropriation
National Football League controversies
Native American topics
Native American-related controversies
Sports mascots in the United States
Name change
Name change
Native American-related lists